Tom Sayers (1826–1865) was a British boxer.

Tom Sayers may also refer to:

Tom Sayers (sound editor), Academy Award nominated sound editor

See also
Thomas Sayers Ellis, poet, photographer and band leader